The Robert C. and Bettie J. (Sponseller) Metcalf House is a single-family home located at 1052 Arlington Boulevard in Ann Arbor, Michigan. It was listed on the National Register of Historic Places in 2016.

History
Robert Clarence Metcalf was born in Nashville, Ohio in 1923. His family moved to Canton, Ohio and then the nearby North Industry, where Metcalf graduated from high school. Determined to be an architect, he went on to the University of Michigan, starting classes in 1941. World War II interrupted, however, and Metcalf entered the army in 1943. He was promoted to Staff Sergeant and eventually commissioned in 1945, receiving a Silver Star the same year. After returning home in 1946, Metcalf resumed his studies and began working for his mentor, George B. Brigham.

In 1950, Metcalf graduated from the University and opened his own practice, pursuing primarily residential commissions. In order to attract clients, Metcalf decided to design and build his own house. His wife Bettie located this lot, and Metcalf spent a year designing the house. In 1952, he began work on this house, moving in in 1953. His practice was soon busy enough that he hired assistants. Metcalf joined the UM Department of Architecture in 1955, became chair of the department in 1986, and dean of the  new College of Architecture and Urban Planning in 1974. He retired from teaching in 1991, and by that time had designed over 80 houses in the Ann Arbor area. Metcalf constructed additions to the house in 1972 and 1987, and added a garage in 2010.

Description
The Robert and Bettie Metcalf House is a one-story, flat-roof, International Style house constructed of wood, steel and concrete. The exterior is clad in glass curtain walls and vertical cedar wood siding. It is a rectilinear structure of about 2,200 square feet, resting on cinder block walls and reinforced concrete footings. The main facade exhibits alternating roof heights, forming three masses: a roof above the entry and the garage at one elevation, and the roof above the living area at a higher elevation.  Clerestory ribbon windows here separate the wall plane from the roof, creating the effect of a floating roof  The dark cedar wood of the walls contrasts with the white of the roof planes. A flush front door flanked by a floor-to-ceiling sidelight is covered by a roof extension, supported by columns, for protection.

The interior contains approximately 2,200 square feet on one floor. It has a generally open plan, with the public areas defined by partitions and built-in furnishings. It has a living/dining area, kitchen, study, and two bedrooms.

References

External links
 Robert C. and Bettie Metcalf House from Michigan Modern

National Register of Historic Places in Washtenaw County, Michigan
Modernist architecture in Michigan
Buildings and structures completed in 1953
Houses in Ann Arbor, Michigan